Owning Mahowny is a 2003 Canadian film about gambling addiction with a cast that includes Philip Seymour Hoffman, Minnie Driver, Maury Chaykin and John Hurt. Based on the true story of a Toronto bank employee who embezzled more than $10 million to feed his gambling habit, Owning Mahowny was named one of the ten best films of the year by critic Roger Ebert.

Plot
Between 1980 and 1982, Toronto bank employee Dan Mahowny is given access to bigger and bigger accounts with his promotion to assistant branch manager. His boss trusts him, but is unaware that Mahowny is a compulsive gambler. Mahowny is soon skimming larger and larger amounts for his own use and making weekly trips to Atlantic City, where he is treated like a king by the casino manager. Mahowny's girlfriend, fellow bank employee Belinda, cannot understand what is happening. Mahowny's criminal acts come to light when Toronto police begin to investigate his longtime bookie Frank.

Cast
 Philip Seymour Hoffman as Dan Mahowny
 Minnie Driver as Belinda
 Maury Chaykin as Frank Perlin
 John Hurt as Victor Foss
 Sonja Smits as Dana Selkirk
 Ian Tracey as Detective Ben Lock
 Jason Blicker as Dave Quinson
 Chris Collins as Bernie
 Matthew Ferguson as Martin
 Janine Theriault as Maggie
 Conrad Dunn as Edgar
 Mike "Nug" Nahrgang as Parking Attendant
 Philip Craig as Briggs
 Tony Munch as Observer #2
 M. J. Kang as Secretary

Production

Background
Owning Mahowny is based on a real-life incident: Canadian Imperial Bank of Commerce clerk Brian Molony embezzled over $10 million from his employers in just 18 months to support his gambling habit. Molony's story was told in the best-selling 1987 book Stung by journalist Gary Ross, which formed the basis for the screenplay.

In an interview on the web site of Stung publishers McClelland and Stewart, Ross says he has kept in touch with Molony and updated what happened to him after the events portrayed in the movie. Molony was sentenced to six years in prison after pleading guilty to fraud, eventually serving only two years of his sentence. He has not gambled since his arrest, has married his girlfriend, has three sons and works as a financial consultant.

Molony was a manager at the Canadian Imperial Bank of Commerce, with access to significant resources. Upon the discovery of his gambling addiction and his crime, he was prosecuted in Canada by Crown Attorney Peter DeJulio. Molony was defended by Edward Greenspan. He received a sentence of six years imprisonment, as sought by the Crown.

The Canadian Imperial Bank of Commerce took court action to recover funds from casinos in Atlantic City that enabled Malony's gambling addiction. The case was settled for an undisclosed sum.

Reception

Critical response
On Rotten Tomatoes the film has a score of 79% based on reviews from 96 critics, with an average rating of 6.99/10. On Metacritic the film has a score of 70% based on reviews from 29 critics, indicating "generally favorable reviews".

Roger Ebert named Owning Mahowny one of the top ten films of 2003, and assessed Hoffman's performance as "a masterpiece of discipline and precision", calling him a "fearless poet of implosion, [who] plays the role with a fierce integrity, never sending out signals for our sympathy because he knows that Mahowny is oblivious to our presence." However, some critics believed that in his self-effacing performance, Hoffman refused to conform to expectations of a typical movie character and that the movie suffered as a result. Stephanie Zacharek considered him to be a "character who squirms right out of our grasp", and despite being the movie's anchor, he's "such a vaporous one, he leaves us feeling adrift".

Asked whether Philip Seymour Hoffman's portrayal matched with the real Brian Molony, journalist Gary Ross replied, "Remarkably so. They have the same stocky build, bushy moustache, glasses, slightly unkempt look, and earnestness. And Philip somehow managed to assimilate the psychic essence of Molony — a yawning emptiness that nothing except gambling was able to fill."

Owning Mahowny earned $1 million, significantly less than its $10 million budget.

Awards
Owning Mahowny received nominations for Best Motion Picture, Best Performance by an Actor in a Leading Role, Best Screenplay (Adapted) and Best Achievement in Music — Original Score (Richard Grassby-Lewis, Jon Hassell) at the 24th Genie Awards.

References

External links
 Official website
 
 
 
 Reel Toronto: Owning Mahowny; filming locations detailed in The Torontoist, December 8, 2009

2003 films
2000s crime films
British drama films
Canadian drama films
2000s business films
English-language Canadian films
Films based on biographies
Films directed by Richard Kwietniowski
2003 independent films
Films set in Atlantic City, New Jersey
Films set in Toronto
Films shot in Toronto
Films shot in Atlantic City, New Jersey
Films about gambling
Sony Pictures Classics films
Trading films
2000s English-language films
2000s Canadian films
2000s British films